Operation Overgrow is the name, given by cannabis activists, of an "operation" to spread marijuana seeds wildly "so it grows like weed". The thought behind the operation is to draw attention to the debate about legalization/decriminalization of marijuana.

See also
Cannabis cultivation
Feral cannabis
Guerrilla gardening

References

Cannabis activism
Cannabis cultivation
Cannabis culture
Drug culture